Condah  is a small town in south west Victoria, Australia and is located on the Henty Highway north of Heywood. At the 2006 census, Condah and the surrounding area had a population of 272.

History
 Condah Pub has been open since 1854 and still thrives today.
 A cemetery was set aside in May 1863.
 Condah Post Office opened on 12 May 1868 and closed in 2001.
 Two churches were opened, one Anglican in 1883, one Presbyterian in 1908.

Traditional ownership
The formally recognised traditional owners for the area in which Condah sits are the Gunditjmara People who are represented by the Gunditj Mirring Traditional Owners Aboriginal Corporation.

Notable people
W J (Billy) Millard, the winner of the inaugural 1878 Stawell Gift was a resident of Condah;
 Andrew Lovett, Wally Lovett, Glenn Lovett and Nathan Lovett-Murray, all AFL football players, are Gunditjmara people either from Lake Condah or have relatives in the area.

References

External links

Towns in Victoria (Australia)
Western District (Victoria)